Cabinda may refer to:

Cabinda Province, an exclave and Province of Angola
Cabinda (city), the administrative capital of Cabinda Province
 Cabinda Airport
 F.C. Cabinda, an association football club
 Sporting Clube de Cabinda, an association football club
 Operation Cabinda, a 1985 military operation carried out in Cabinda Province by the South African Special Forces during the South African Border War
 Roman Catholic Diocese of Cabinda
 Jason Cabinda (born 1996), American football linebacker

Political movements
Republic of Cabinda, Cabinda Free State self-proclaimed government which claims sovereignty over Cabinda
 Action Committee of the Cabinda National Union, a defunct separatist organization
 Communist Committee of Cabinda, a militant separatist group
 Democratic Front of Cabinda, a separatist group
 Front for the Liberation of the Enclave of Cabinda, a guerrilla and political movement fighting for the independence of Cabinda
 Cabinda War, waged by the FLEC
 Forças Armadas de Cabinda, the armed wing of the FLEC
 Liberation Front of the State of Cabinda, a separatist group
 Mayombe National Alliance, a defunct separatist organization
 Movement for the Liberation of the Enclave of Cabinda, a defunct separatist organization
 National Union for the Liberation of Cabinda, a militant separatist group
 Popular Movement for the Liberation of Cabinda, a possibly-disbanded militant separatist group

See also
 Kabinda (disambiguation)